Bishop's Gambit is a move in chess. It may also refer to:

 "Bishop's Gambit" (Legends of Tomorrow), an episode of Legends of Tomorrow
 "Bishop's Gambit" (Teenage Mutant Ninja Turtles), an episode of Teenage Mutant Ninja Turtles
 "The Bishop's Gambit", an episode of Yes, Prime Minister